Tsamantas is a village located in Epirus. Tsamantas lies near to the border with Albania in northern Greece, in the regional unit of Thesprotia. Indeed, the Albanian border is very clearly visible from the high lofts that are Tsamantas, the highest mountain in the region.

You can also see Corfu on a clear day in the distance to your left, as you stand facing the Albanian border.

An incredibly beautiful and scenic location, with some of the purest mountain water found anywhere in the Hellenic Republic. Due to 'chain migration', many descendants of the inhabitants of Tsamantas now live in Worcester Massachusetts, or in Melbourne Australia, with a few others in Athens, Thessaloniki and other locales.

However, whilst expatriates do visit throughout the year, every August 15, being the Saint or Feast Day of Mary, the Mother of Jesus, the place comes alive. People from around the globe with a personal link to Tsamantas return to celebrate, to mingle and to reclaim their roots.

Names associated with this village include Pelekanos, Balis, Bellos, Dzimas, Kenos, Lenis, Sdrinis, Pantazakos, Lagos, Zotos, Malamis and Zoulas amongst many many others.

Tsamantas was referenced in the 2016 Jason Bourne film Jason Bourne in the opening scene Bourne, depicted by Matt Damon, engages in a boxing match which the villagers place wagers on. Bourne wins the match with a single punch knock out.

Nearest places
Filiates
Vavouri
Leshnica e Poshtme
Leshnica e Sipërme

References

The village of Tsamantas
Tsamantas Map

Populated places in Thesprotia